The  is a railway line operated by the Japanese private railway operator Keio Corporation. The line connects Kitano Station on the Keio Line, to Takaosanguchi Station, and offers access to Mount Takao at the terminal. It is  gauge, electrified at 1,500 V DC. The line originally terminated at Goryōmae to service visitors to the Musashi Imperial Graveyard.

During the daytime, most trains operate through to/from the Shinjuku terminal on the Keio Line.

Service patterns
On the Takao Line, Keio operates six different service types, with trains running through to and from the Keio Main Line.
   (L)
   (R)
   (SeE)
   (E)
   (SpE)
  Mt.TAKAO (MT) - Reserved-seat supplementary-fare services to and from Shinjuku, operating on weekends and holidays with three round-trips.

Stations
All stations are in Hachiōji, Tokyo.

Legend
● : All trains stop
▲ : Shinjuku-bound trains stop to pick up passengers
│ : All trains pass

History

Former Goryō Line
On March 20, 1930, the Keio Electric Tramway opened the Goryō Line, a 6.3 km branch of the Keio Line, electrified at 600 V DC, between Kitano Station and Goryōmae Station. The terminus, Goryōmae, was a gateway for the tomb of Emperor Taishō.

The line had three intermediate stations: Katakura, Yamada, and Yokoyama. Yokoyama Station and Goryōmae Station were renamed Musashi-Yokoyama Station and Tamagoryōmae Station respectively in 1937. The line was single track and had a passing loop at Yokoyama Station. On weekdays, the line operated at 30 or 40 minute intervals, while at weekends it operated through trains to Yotsuya-Shinjuku Station, the Tokyo terminal of Keio at that time, at 20-minute intervals.

The Keio Electric Tramway was merged into Tokyō Kyūko Dentetsu (present-day Tokyu Corporation) in 1944. The new operator suspended operation of the Goryō Line on January 21, 1945, as a "not needed or not pressing" line, which was subject of the collection of metal for the war effort.

In 1948, Keio Teito Electric Railway (present-day Keio Corporation) was established and succeeded the former operation of Keiō Electric Tramway including the suspended Goryō Line.

Takao Line
During the economic boom in 1960s, Keio decided to build a new line to Mount Takao utilizing a part of the (effectively closed) Goryō Line. Keio opened the Takao Line on October 1, 1967, electrified at 1,500 V DC and dual track to Takao station. Of the former Goryō Line stations, Katakura Station (newly named Keiō-Katakura Station) and Yamada Station were revived.

References
This article incorporates material from the corresponding article in the Japanese Wikipedia.

External links
 Keio Corporation website 

Takao Line
Railway lines in Tokyo
4 ft 6 in gauge railways in Japan